Novotroitskoye is a rural locality (a village) and the administrative center of Novokirsanovskoye Rural Settlement, Ternovsky District, Voronezh Oblast, Russia. The population was 579 as of 2010. There are 9 streets.

Geography
Novotroitskoye is located 20 km west of Ternovka (the district's administrative centre) by road. Rusanovo is the nearest rural locality.

References 

Rural localities in Ternovsky District